Cochlostyla ovoidea is a species of small, air-breathing land snail, a terrestrial pulmonate gastropod mollusks in the family Bradybaenidae, subfamily Helicostylinae. This species can be found in the Philippines.

References
Zipcodezoo
Organism Names

Bradybaenidae